Igor Vladimirovich Vasilyev (born January 24, 1966) is a Russian former handball player who competed for the Unified Team in the 1992 Summer Olympics. He was born in Volgograd. In 1992 he won the gold medal with the Unified Team. He played all seven matches and scored two goals.

External links
Igor Vasilyev's profile at Sports Reference.com
Interview with Igor Vasilyev 

1966 births
Living people
Russian male handball players
Olympic handball players of the Unified Team
Soviet male handball players
Handball players at the 1992 Summer Olympics
Olympic gold medalists for the Unified Team
Olympic medalists in handball
Medalists at the 1992 Summer Olympics
Sportspeople from Volgograd